Neyman is a surname. Notable people with the surname include:

Abraham Neyman (born 1949), Israeli mathematician
Benny Neyman (1951–2008), Dutch singer
Jerzy Neyman (1894–1981), Polish mathematician, known for a.o. the Neyman construction and the Neyman–Pearson lemma
Sergei Neyman (born 1967), Russian footballer
Yuri Neyman (born c. 1950), Russian-American cinematographer, educator and inventor

See also
Nieman (surname)
Nijman
Nyman

Jewish surnames